Sir William Stephens (c.1641 –1697) was a British Member of Parliament.

He was the first son of  William Stephens and his wife Anne Redman (widow of Edward Harbert) and was educated at the Middle Temple (1656) and New College, Oxford (1658). 

He was the Member of Parliament for Newport (IoW) from 1685 to 1687 and 1689 to 1695. He was knighted in 1684 and appointed Lieutenant-Governor of the Isle of Wight for c.1689–93.

He married Elizabeth, the daughter of Henry Hillary of Meerhay, Dorset, and had 2 sons and 5 daughters. Their son William was also an MP for Newport and later Governor of Georgia.

See also
William Stephens (disambiguation)

References

1641 births
1697 deaths
Alumni of New College, Oxford
Members of the Middle Temple
English MPs 1685–1687
English MPs 1689–1690
English MPs 1690–1695
Knights Bachelor
Politicians awarded knighthoods